Statistics of Soviet Top League for the 1972 season.

Overview
Sixteen (16) teams competed for the championships, and Zarya Voroshilovgrad won the championship.

League standings

Results

Top scorers
14 goals
 Oleg Blokhin (Dynamo Kyiv)

13 goals
 Oganes Zanazanyan (Ararat)

12 goals
 Gennadi Khromchenkov (Zenit)
 Yuri Smirnov (Torpedo Moscow)

11 goals
 Viktor Kolotov (Dynamo Kyiv)

10 goals
 Anatoliy Banishevskiy (Neftchi)
 Vladimir Onischenko (Zorya)
 Aleksei Yeskov (SKA Rostov-on-Don)

9 goals
 Arkady Andreasyan (Ararat)
 Vladimir Muntyan (Dynamo Kyiv)
 Pavel Sadyrin (Zenit)
 Anatoli Vasilyev (Dinamo Minsk)
 Yuri Yeliseyev (Zorya)

References
Soviet Union - List of final tables (RSSSF)

1969
1
Soviet
Soviet